Shaheed Kavi Mehar Singh Dahiya (1916-1945) commonly known as Fauji Mehar Singh and Jat Mehar Singh, was a famous Haryanavi poet. He was born in Dahiya clan of Jats in village Barona in Kharkhoda tahsil, district Sonipat (Rohtak district at that time), Haryana. In addition to Haryana, his ragnis are still popular in Delhi, Western Uttar Pradesh and Rajasthan. According to records of Jat Regiment, he was born on 15 February 1916. His father, Shri Nand Ram, was a simple farmer. Due to economic conditions of the house, he could get primary school education till Class-III only. From Childhood, he was fond of singing ragnis. His father was annoyed about his habit of singing of ragnis, but he was not successful in keeping him away from this hobby. He was married to Prem Kaur. In 1937, Mehar Singh joined the army. There also, he kept singing and recording ragnis. During Second World War, he and his army colleagues allied with Azad Hind Fauj. In 1945, he got martyrdom while fighting for the cause of India's freedom.

Legacy
Some activities held in his native village and state, in his honour:
The Fauji Jaat Mehar Singh Award is given to folk singers  by the Chief Minister of Haryana State, for their contribution to promoting the culture and traditions of Haryana.
15 February is celebrated as a day in Memory of Mehar Singh and a Ragani Programme is organised every year.
A school children's programme on November 14 is organised every year.
A Health Camp is organised once a year in which retired and working doctors of PGIMS Rohtak participate on voluntary basis.
A book of his writings has been published.
A Statue of Mehar Singh has been installed in 2 acres of land donated by the Panchayat of the village.

See also
 Saang
 Haryanvi Cinema
 Haryanvi music
 Haryanvi language
 Indian musical instruments
 List of Indian folk dances
 List of Haryanvi-language films
 Haryanvi cinema
 Baje Bhagat
 Dayachand Mayna
 Lakhmi Chand

References

1916 births
1945 deaths
Indian male poets
Folk artists from Haryana
Poets from Haryana
20th-century Indian poets
20th-century Indian male writers
Indian military personnel of World War II
Indian National Army personnel
Military personnel killed in World War II